Loucrup is a commune in the Hautes-Pyrénées department in south-western France.

Sight and monuments 

 Saint-Martin Church (19th century)
 Roman oppidum at the sources of the Aube on the Toulouse-Dax Roman road
 Medieval castle now disappeared that was on the road to Layrisse
 Former station on the Campan-Lourdes tramway line that operated from 1914 to 1932 (Tramway de la Bigorre)
 viewpoint over the Pyrénées
 Source of the Aube, a tributary of the Échez
 Tourist route between Bagnères-de-Bigorre and Lourdes

People linked to the commune
 Antoine Duffourc (born 1851 in Loucrup; died 1926 in Beaudéan) was a French historian. He wrote numerous works on the history of the Hautes-Pyrénées.

See also
Communes of the Hautes-Pyrénées department

References

Communes of Hautes-Pyrénées
Hautes-Pyrénées communes articles needing translation from French Wikipedia